The Edmonton Oilers are a professional ice hockey franchise based in Edmonton, Alberta. They play in the Pacific Division of the Western Conference in the National Hockey League (NHL). They were founded in 1972 as a member of the World Hockey Association (WHA) and played in the WHA until 1979 when they joined the NHL. During their time in the WHA the Oilers drafted 59 players with the 1977 draft being their fifth and final. The NHL Oilers have drafted 395 players in 41 drafts.

The NHL Entry Draft is held each June, allowing teams to select players who have turned 18 years old by September 15 in the year the draft is held. The draft order is determined by the previous season's order of finish, with non-playoff teams drafting first, followed by the teams that made the playoffs, with the specific order determined by the number of points earned by each team. Since 2016, the NHL holds a weighted lottery for the 15 non-playoff teams, allowing the winners to move up to the top three selections. From 1995–2012 the winner of the draft lottery was allowed to move up a maximum of four positions in the entry draft. The team with the fewest points has the best chance of winning the lottery, with each successive team given a lower chance of moving up in the draft. The Oilers have won the lottery three times, in 2010, 2012 and 2015. Between 1986 and 1994, the NHL also held a Supplemental Draft for players in American colleges.

Edmonton's first draft pick in the WHA was John Rogers, taken sixth overall in the 1973 WHA Amateur Draft. Their first pick in the NHL was Kevin Lowe, taken 21st overall in the 1979 NHL Entry Draft. The highest the Oilers have picked is first overall, which they did on three successive occasions between 2010 and 2012 and, most recently, 2015. They selected Taylor Hall (2010), Ryan Nugent-Hopkins (2011), Nail Yakupov (2012), and Connor McDavid (2015). Thirteen picks went on to play over 1,000 NHL games: Kevin Lowe (21st, 1979), Mark Messier (48th, 1979), Glenn Anderson (69th, 1979), Paul Coffey (6th, 1980), Jari Kurri (69th, 1980), Kelly Buchberger (188th, 1985), Kirk Maltby (65th, 1992), Jason Arnott (7th, 1993), Miroslav Satan (111th, 1993), Ryan Smyth (6th, 1994), Jason Chimera (121st, 1997), Shawn Horcoff (99th, 1998), and Sam Gagner (6th, 2007). Six of Edmonton's draft picks, Anderson, Coffey, Grant Fuhr (8th, 1981), Kurri, Lowe, and Messier, have been elected to the Hockey Hall of Fame.

Key

Draft picks

WHA
Statistics show each player's career regular season totals in the WHA. A player listed with a dash under the games played column did not play in the WHA.

NHL

Statistics are complete as of the 2021–22 NHL season and show each player's career regular season totals in the NHL. Wins, losses, ties, overtime losses and goals against average apply to goaltenders and are used only for players at that position. A player listed with a dash under the games played column has not played in the NHL.

See also
List of Edmonton Oilers players
1979 NHL Expansion Draft

References

External links
 
 
 
 

 
draft picks
Edmonton Oilers